Reed  may be either a surname or given name.

Reed as a surname

"Reed" is commonly believed to be a nickname-derived surname referring to a person's complexion or hair being ruddy or red.

At least one example of the Reed surname, that originating in the County of Northumberland in northern England, is derived from a location, the valley of Redesdale and the River Rede that runs through it.

In the United States, Reed was adopted by some Pennsylvania Dutch (German) families in the 18th century, notably that of John Reed (Johannes Reith), a former Hessian soldier from Raboldshausen, Germany, who made the first documented gold find in the United States in 1799. The Reed Gold Mine is today a State Historic Site in Cabarrus County, North Carolina.

'Reed' appears as a surname most commonly in English-speaking countries, especially in the United States, where it was the 55th most common surname in 1990 accounting for about 0.12% of the population. In Great Britain, 'Reed' ranked at 158th (0.081%) and 183rd (0.073%) in 1881 and 1998, respectively, with little or no change in internal distribution among counties during the intervening century. In Ireland, Reed is among the 100 most common surnames, and in the Irish province of Ulster it is among the 40 most common surnames. The relative frequencies in 1998 among several countries were United States >> Great Britain > Australia ~ New Zealand ~ Canada >> Northern Ireland >> Ireland.

'Reed' has been adopted by several notable actors as their stage surname in preference to their birth names (see #Pseudonyms and aliases, below).

Reeds of Northumberland 
The Reeds of Northumberland in England were originally centered around the chief Reed residence at Troughend in Redesdale, on the banks of the River Rede. According to Sir Walter Scott:

The earliest reference to the Reeds of Troughend is from 1400, when "Thomas Reed of Redysdale" is recorded in county records as paying "to William de Swinburne in the sum of 20 pds...for the ransom of William Moetrop of Tenedale". In 1429 Thomas Reed is again recorded, as serving on a jury in Elsdon. In 1442, a John Reed is described as "the Laird of Troughwen, the chief of the name of Reed, and divers of his followers...a ruder and more lawless crew there needs not be..."

The Reeds of Northumberland were one of the Border Reiver families of the 16th century, who lived by blackmail and cattle rustling in the Anglo-Scottish border country.

One notable Reed was Percival Reed, believed to have been Laird of Troughend in the 1580s and 1590s. His story has been handed down in The Death of Parcy Reed, a traditional Border ballad (Child Ballad 193). This song tells of an alliance between the Halls of Redesdale and the Crosiers of Liddesdale in Scotland, against the Reeds. Percival Reed held the office of Keeper of Redesdale, and had arrested one Whinton Crosier for raiding in the valley. This put the Reeds at feud with the Crosier family. The Halls, old friends of Percy Reed, turned against him and conspired with the Crosiers to trap him while he was out hunting. When the Crosiers ambushed Percy, the Halls watched as he was murdered. Percy stood alone unarmed against the Crosiers, and according to the ballad:

Percy Reed's ghost is said to have haunted Redesdale for many years, and "at times he would come gallantly cantering across the moorland as he had done when blood ran warm in his veins. ...And yet, again, he would come as a fluttering, homeless soul, whimpering and formless, with a moaning cry for Justice—Justice—Judgment on him who had by black treachery hurried him unprepared to his end."

In Norway
Many Norwegians use a last name derived from their family farm or town. Reed is a village in Sogn og Fjordane county in Norway. As of 2010, 325 share the surname Reed.

Geographical distribution 
At the time of the United Kingdom Census of 1881, the frequency of the surname Reed was highest in the following counties:

 1. Northumberland (1: 378)
 2. County Durham (1: 419)
 3. Sussex (1: 456)
 4. Huntingdonshire (1: 487)
 5. Devon (1: 509)
 6. Cornwall (1: 519)
 7. Cumberland (1: 572)
 8. Essex (1: 641)
 9. Somerset (1: 650)
 10. Hertfordshire (1: 651)

As of 2014, the frequency of the surname was highest in the following countries and territories:

 1. United States (1: 1,071)
 2. United States Virgin Islands (1: 1,612)
 3. Wales (1: 1,675)
 4. American Samoa (1: 1,851)
 5. Liberia (1: 1,916)
 6. England (1: 1,917)
 7. Anguilla (1: 1,922)
 8. Jersey (1: 1,980)
 9. Cayman Islands (1: 2,133)
 10. New Zealand (1: 2,301)

As of 2014, 78.4% of all known bearers of the surname Reed were residents of the United States. The frequency of the surname was higher than national average in the following U.S. states:

 1. Arkansas (1: 491)
 2. West Virginia (1: 505)
 3. Mississippi (1: 554)
 4. Tennessee (1: 556)
 5. Wyoming (1: 634)
 6. Oklahoma (1: 639)
 7. Kentucky (1: 650)
 8. Delaware (1: 662)
 9. Louisiana (1: 667)
 10. Indiana (1: 713)
 11. Missouri (1: 723)
 12. Kansas (1: 726)
 13. Vermont (1: 733)
 14. Alabama (1: 753)
 15. Ohio (1: 762)
 16. Maine (1: 807)
 17. Iowa (1: 858)
 18. Idaho (1: 875)
 19. Texas (1: 918)
 20. Oregon (1: 940)
 21. Colorado (1: 945)
 22. Michigan (1: 949)
 23. Pennsylvania (1: 1,012)
 24. Washington (1: 1,025)
 25. Virginia (1: 1,031)
 26. Maryland (1: 1,036)
 27. Alaska (1: 1,039)
 28. Illinois (1: 1,064)

The frequency of the surname was highest (over six times the national average) in the following U.S. counties:

 1. Coleman County, Texas (1: 48)
 2. Washington County, Ala. (1: 58)
 3. Issaquena County, Miss. (1: 70)
 4. Briscoe County, Texas (1: 73)
 5. Cannon County, Tenn. (1: 77)
 6. Love County, Okla. (1: 80)
 7. Rhea County, Tenn. (1: 84)
 8. Cleveland County, Ark. (1: 94)
 9. Cameron County, Pa. (1: 102)
 10. Daggett County, Utah (1: 102)
 11. Hardin County, Ill. (1: 105)
 12. Owsley County, Ky. (1: 108)
 13. Jefferson County, Miss. (1: 111)
 14. Carter County, Mo. (1: 112)
 15. Niobrara County, Wyo. (1: 116)
 16. Evangeline Parish, La. (1: 118)
 17. Floyd County, Va. (1: 125)
 18. Iron County, Mo. (1: 129)
 19. Humphreys County, Miss. (1: 129)
 20. Winston County, Miss. (1: 130)
 21. Robertson County, Ky. (1: 131)
 22. Thomas County, Neb. (1: 140)
 23. Magoffin County, Ky. (1: 147)
 24. Sherman County, Texas (1: 147)
 25. Upshur County, W.Va. (1: 159)
 26. Summers County, W.Va. (1: 160)
 27. Wyoming County, W.Va. (1: 166)
 28. Esmeralda County, Nev. (1: 166)
 29. Gilmer County, W.Va. (1:173)

Notable persons with the surname Reed 
There are many notable people who share the Reed surname. These people are listed below to provide a partial geographical and time reference for use of this name. People listed below are presumed to be white unless otherwise indicated parenthetically; this information is included as ethnicity is an important parameter in name studies. Ethnicities found below include African American and Jewish. Multiple items on a line is indicated by a superscript number associated with country of origin. All information included in the list below has been drawn from the referenced articles without input from other external sources.

Born after 1300
Robert Reed (bishop) (after 1350 – 1415), Ireland or England, alternatively spelled "Robert Reade"

Born after 1700
James Reed (soldier) (c. 1723 – 1807), United States 
Joseph Reed (politician) (1741–1785), United States  
Isaac Reed (1742–1807), England 
John Reed Sr. (1751–1831), United States  
Philip Reed (politician) (1760–1829), United States 
John Reed Jr. (1781–1860), United States  
Luman Reed (1787–1836), United States 
Thomas Buck Reed (1787–1829), United States 
Andrew Reed (minister) (1787–1862), England ,
Edward C. Reed (1793–1883), United States

Born after 1800
Charles Manning Reed (1803–1871), United States 
William Bradford Reed (1806–1876), United States  
Henry Reed (merchant) (1806–1880), England 
Robert Rentoul Reed (1807–1864), United States 
Isaac Reed (politician) (1809–1887), United States 
Harrison Reed (politician) (1813–1899), United States 
Thomas German Reed (1817–1888), England 
Thomas Reed (architect) (1817–1878), Denmark 
Thomas Sadler Reed (1818–1914), England emigrated to South Australia 
Charles Reed (1819–1881), England  
Byron Reed (1821–1891), United States 
Joseph Reed (architect) (c. 1823 – 1890), England, emigrated to Australia 
Elijah W. Reed (1827–1888), United States 
Edward James Reed (1830–1906), England 
Simeon Gannett Reed (1830–1895), United States 
James Sewall Reed (1832–1864), United States, Civil War cavalry officer 
Amanda Reed (1832–1904), United States, 'Reed' being her married name, her maiden name not known 
William B. Reed (politician) (1833–1909), United States, mayor of South Norwalk, Connecticut (1891–1892) and successful oysterman 
Joseph Rea Reed (1835–1925), United States 
Charles N. Reed (1837–1926), United States 
Thomas Brackett Reed (1839–1902), United States 
P. Booker Reed (1842–1913), United States, moved to Canada late in life 
Elizabeth Armstrong Reed (1842–1915), United States née Armstrong 
Albert Edwin Reed (1846–1920), England 
David C. Reed (1847–1938), United States 
Walter Reed (1851–1902), United States 
Talbot Baines Reed (1852–1893), England  
John Oren Reed (1856–1916), United States 
Henry Armstrong Reed (1858–1876), United States 
Andrew Reed (police officer) (fl. 1860 – 1880), Ireland 
James A. Reed (politician) (1861–1944), United States 
Ida Lilliard Reed (1865–1951), United States 
Reed Green (politician) (1865–1937), United States 
Stuart F. Reed (1866–1935), United States 
Eugene Elliott Reed (1866–1940), United States 
Hamilton Lyster Reed (1869–1931), Ireland 
Clyde M. Reed (1871–1949), United States 
William Maxwell Reed (1871–1962), United States 
Stanley Reed (British politician) (1872–1969), United Kingdom or India 
Myrtle Reed (1874–1911), United States  
Dorothy Reed Mendenhall (1874–1964), United States née Reed 
Daniel A. Reed (1875–1959), United States 
Alfred Hamish Reed (1875–1975), England, emigrated to New Zealand 
Roy E. Reed (1877–1943), United States 
Langford Reed (1878–1954), England 
David A. Reed (1880–1953), United States 
James B. Reed (1881–1935), United States 
Lionel Reed (1883–????), United Kingdom 
Henry Reed (musician) (1884–1968), United States 
Stanley Forman Reed (1884–1980), United States 
Guilford Bevil Reed (1887–1955), Canada 
John Reed (journalist) (1887–1920), United States 
Theodore Reed (1887–1959), United States 
Luther Reed (1888–1961), United States 
Milt Reed (1890–1938), United States 
Chauncey W. Reed (1890–1956), United States 
Ted Reed (1890–1959), United States 
Marshall Russell Reed (1891–1973), United States 
Daniel Reed (actor) (1892–1978), United States 
Geoffrey Reed (1892–1970), Australia 
Vivian Reed (silent film actress) (1894–1989), United States 
Basil Reed (1895–1968), England 
Douglas Reed (1895–1976), England, emigrated to South Africa 
Dewey H. Reed (1897-1966), United States 
Robin Reed (1899–1978), United States 
Philip D. Reed (1899–1989), United States 
Joseph Reed (?–?), United States 
Caroline Keating Reed (?–1954), United States

Born after 1900
John Reed (art patron) (1901–1981), Australia  
Sykes Reed (1904–1972), United States 
Victor Joseph Reed (1905–1971), United States 
Evelyn Reed (1905–1979), United States 
Sunday Reed (1905–1981), Australia, née Baillieu 
Carol Reed (1906–1976), England, took maternal surname rather than paternal (Tree) 
Cyril Reed (1906–1991), India, emigrated to England 
Phillip Reed (1908–1996), United States (actor) 
Albert Reed Jr. (1910–1990), United States 
H. Owen Reed (1910–2014), United States 
Henry Reed (poet) (1914–1986), England 
Enrique Reed (1915–1958), Chile 
Janet Reed (1916–2000), United States 
Walter Reed (actor) (1916–2001), United States 
Ola Belle Reed (1916–2002), United States 
John Reed (actor) (1916–2010), England 
Stanley Foster Reed (1917–2007), United States 
Maxwell Reed (1919–1974), Ireland 
Paul Reed (artist) (1919–2015), United States 
Alfred Reed (1921–2005), United States 
John H. Reed (1921–2012), United States 
Lucy Reed (1921–1998), United States (jazz singer) 
Irving S. Reed (1923–2012), United States 
Theresa Greene Reed (1923–2017), United States 
Jack Reed (1924–2016), United States Mississippi politician 
Jimmy Reed (1925–1976), United States blues musician 
Carol Reed (weather broadcaster) (c. 1926 – 1970), United States 
Ian Reed (1927–2020), Australia 
David E. Reed (1927–1990), United States 
Barry Reed (1927–2002), United States 
Betty Lou Reed (1927–2011), United States 
Billy Reed (1928–2003), Wales 
Clarke Reed (born 1928), United States 
Whitney Reed (1932–2015), United States 
Robert Reed (1932–1992), United States, born with the name "Rietz" 
Jack Reed (baseball) (1933–2022), United States 
Donald H. Reed Jr. (born 1933), United States 
Thomas C. Reed (born 1934), United States 
Les Reed (songwriter) (1935–2019), England 
Julian Reed (1936–2022), Canada 
Howie Reed (1936–1984), United States 
Hub Reed (born 1936), United States 
Laurance Reed (born 1937), 2 England, Terence James Reed 
Jerry Reed (1937–2008), United States country musician 
Dean Reed (1938–1986), United States, permanently settled in East Germany in 1973 
Oliver Reed (1938–1999), England , English actor 
Rex Reed (born 1938), United States 
Ishmael Reed (born 1938), United States (African American) 
George Reed (born 1939), 2 United States, John S. Reed 
Leo Reed (1939–2022), United States, labor leader 
Fred A. Reed (born 1939), Canada 
Herbert Reed (British Army soldier) (died 1940), England 
Betty Reed (1941–2022), United States 
Tracy Reed (English actress) (1942–2012), England née Pelissier 
Willis Reed (born 1942), United States (African American) 
Lou Reed (1942–2013), United States musician 
Michael C. Reed (born 1942), 2 United States, mathematician, Ron Reed 
Bob Reed (born 1943), United States 
David Reed (politician) (1945–2017), United Kingdom 
Rosalie A. Reed (born 1945), United States, veterinarian 
Alvin Reed (born 1944), 2 United States, Oscar Reed 
Francine Reed (born 1947), United States (African American) 
Chuck Reed (born 1948), 2 United States, Joe Reed 
 
Tracy Reed (American actress) (born 1949), United States (African American) 
Caitriona Reed (born 1949), 4 United States, Jack Reed, Pamela Reed, Stephen R. Reed

Born after 1950
Rick Reed (umpire) (1950–2020), United States 
Jeremy Reed (writer) (born 1951), England 
Les Reed (football coach) (born 1952), England 
David P. Reed (born 1952), United States 
Joan Reed (born 1952), England 
Les Reed (born 1952), English football coach and former manager of Charlton Athletic
Ann Reed (born 1954), 3 United States, Butch Reed, Frank Reed (singer) 
Jerry Reed (baseball) (born 1955), 3 United States, Kevin Reed, Mark Reed (physicist) 
Preston Reed (born 1955), United States, emigrated to Scotland 
Robert Reed (author) (born 1956), 2 United States, Shanna Reed 
Alyson Reed (born 1958), United States 
Doug Reed (born 1960), United States 
Ralph Reed (born 1961), United States 
Donald G. Reed (born 1961), United States 
Lewis E. Reed (born 1962), United States (politician Saint Louis Mo.) 
Jeff Reed (baseball) (born 1962), 2 United States, Jody Reed 
Dizzy Reed (born 1963), United States 
James A. Reed (entrepreneur) (born 1963), England 
Andy Reed (politician) (born 1964), England 
Andre Reed (born 1964), 3 United States, Peyton Reed, Rick Reed (pitcher) 
Steve Reed (baseball) (born 1965), United States 
Jake Reed (American football) (born 1967), United States 
Rodney Reed (born 1967), United States 
John Reed (novelist) (born 1969), United States 
Eric Reed (musician) (born 1970), United States 
Killah Priest (born 1970), United States, born "Walter Reed" 
Adam Reed (born 1970), United States 
Kira Reed (born 1971), United States 
Brett Reed (born 1972), United States 
Tayo Reed (born 1973), United States 
Jamie Reed (born 1973), England 
Tanoai Reed (born 1974), United States 
Adam Reed (footballer, born 1975) (born 1975), England 
Brandy Reed (born 1977), 2 United States, James Reed 
Martin Reed (born 1978), England 
Dave L. Reed (born 1978), 3 United States, Ed Reed, Jennie Reed 
Jeff Reed (American football) (born 1979), 3 United States, Natina Reed, Travis Reed 
Eric Reed (born 1980), 2 United States, Tatum Reed 
Brandon Reed (born 1980), United States (Kentucky politician) 
Josh Reed (born 1980), United States 
Jeremy Reed (born 1981), United States 
Gary Reed (athlete) (born 1981), United States, emigrated to Canada 
Pete Reed (born 1981), United States, emigrated to United Kingdom 
Rayshun Reed (born 1981), United States 
J. R. Reed (American football, born 1982), United States, American football
Justin Reed (born 1982), United States 
Chad Reed (born 1982), Australia 
David Reed (comedian) (born 1982), United Kingdom 
Kate Reed (born 1982), United Kingdom, long-distance runner 
Tyler Reed (born 1982), United States 
Eric Reed (soccer player) (born 1983), United States 
Kerry Reed (born 1984), United States 
Stephen Reed (footballer) (born 1985), England 
Albert Reed (born 1985), United States 
Crystal Reed (born 1985), United States 
Jamie Reed (footballer) (born 1987), England 
Cathy Reed (born 1987), United States, emigrated to Japan 
Harrison Reed (ice hockey) (born 1988), Canada 
Jack Reed (rugby league) (born 1988), England 
Michael Reed (born 1988), England 
Nikki Reed (born 1988), United States 
Chris Reed (born 1989), United States, emigrated to Japan 
Tucker Reed (born 1989), United States, Blogger, author, journalist and feminist activist 
Dominic Reed (born 1990), England 
Patrick Reed (born 1990), United States 
Trovon Reed (born 1990), United States 
Taylor Reed (born 1991), United States 
Jake Reed (baseball) (born 1992), United States 
Jarran Reed (born 1992), United States 
A. J. Reed (born 1993), United States 
D. J. Reed (born 1996), United States 
Malik Reed (born 1996), United States 
Jennifer Clyburn Reed, United States

People born after 2000
Jayden Reed (born 2000), United States

Living with unknown birth year
 United Kingdom2 (living) Julia Reed, Mark Reed (figure skater) 
 United States24 (living) Daniel A. Reed (computer scientist), Darrell Reed, Edward Reed (coach), Gary Reed (comics), John T. Reed, John Shedd Reed, Lawrence Reed, Lowell Reed, Pam Reed, Phil Reed, Ralph Reed (American Express), Sam Reed, Susan Reed (district attorney), Thell Reed (Shooter), Tracy Reed (writer) 
 United States (living) Raphew Reed Jr, Leon Reed

Compound surnames
 Davis-Reed: United States (living) Timothy Davis-Reed

Pseudonyms and aliases
Donald Reed (1901–1973), Mexico, born "Ernesto Avila Guillen", emigrated to the United States 
 United States 
Alan Reed (1907–1977), born "Teddy Bergman" 
Donna Reed (1921–1986), born "Donnabelle Mullenger" 
B. Mitchel Reed (1926–1983), born "Burton Mitchel Goldberg" 
Alaina Reed Hall (1946–2009), sometimes billed as "Alaina Reed" (African American)
Alto Reed (living), American saxophonist

Fictional characters
 Australian television: Shannon Reed, Reed (Home and Away)
 Japanese anime and manga: Clow Reed, Kazana Reed, Fei-Wang Reed, Lucy Reed
 English literature: surname of Jane Eyre's aunt's family in Charlotte Brontë's Jane Eyre
 United States television: Curtis Reed, Billie Reed, Austin Reed (fiction), Lauren Reed, Malcolm Reed, Jonathan Reed (African American), Nikki Reed Fulton Reed (mighty duck's), Reed (Andi Mack)
 Scott Reed, a character in the Netflix series 13 Reasons Why
 Webcomics: Marten Reed from Questionable Content

Reed as a given name

"Reed" is an uncommon male and female given name. In the United States, "Reed" fluctuated among ranks of 400th to 1100th from 1881 through 2006, showing peaks in 1995 (rank 414) and 1949 (417) and a nadir in 1886 (1079). Information for other countries has insufficient depth to detect use of "Reed" as a given name.

Born after 1800
 United States
Reed Smoot (1862–1941)
Reed A. Albee (1886–1961)
Reed F. Cutler (1887–1964)
Reed Chambers (1894–1972)

Born after 1900
 United States
 (1911–1974) Reed Hadley
 (1911–2002) Reed Green
 (1917–1986) Reed Sarratt
 (1917–1982) Reed Crandall
 (1922–2004) Reed Irvine
 (born c. 1942) Reed Wickner
 Canada (born 1945) Reed Elley
 United States2 (born 1948) Reed Hundt, Reed V. Hillman
 United States2 (born 1949) Reed Waller, Reed Slatkin

Born after 1950
 United States
 (born 1956) Reed Larson
 (born 1963) Reed Pierce
 (born 1964) Reed Gershwind
 (born 1967) Reed Diamond
 (born 1972) Reed Cowan
 (born 1976) Reed Johnson
 Canada (born 1976) Reed Low
 United States
 (born 1980) Reed Gusciora
 (born 1982) Reed Doughty
 (born 1994) Reed Alexander
 (born 1999) Reed Blankenship

Living with unknown birth year
 United States Reed Arvin, American record producer
 United States Reed Shuldiner, American law professor at the University of Pennsylvania Law School

Pseudonyms and aliases
 United States
Reed Cowan (born "Darrin Reed Cowan")
Reed Erickson (born "Rita Alma Erickson")
Reed Ghazala (born "Qubais Reed Ghazala")
Reed Hastings (born "Wilmot Reed Hastings, Jr.")
Reed Sorenson (born "Bradley Reed Sorenson")
Reed Whittemore (born "Edward Reed Whittemore Jr.")

Fictional characters
 United States television: Reed Adamson (Grey's Anatomy)
 United States television: Reed Garrett (CSI: NY), Reed Pollock, Reed (Fresh Beat Band of Spies)
 United States comics: Reed Richards

See also
Reed (disambiguation)
Read (surname)
Reid, about the surname
Reid (disambiguation), about the given name
Reade (name), given name and surname
Rede (disambiguation)
Rhead

Human name disambiguation pages
Adam Reed (disambiguation)
Alex Reed (disambiguation)
Andrew Reed (disambiguation)
Daniel Reed (disambiguation)
David Reed (disambiguation)
Donald Reed (disambiguation)
Edward Reed (disambiguation)
Henry Reed (disambiguation)
J. R. Reed (disambiguation)
Jack Reed (disambiguation)
James Reed (disambiguation)
Jeff Reed (disambiguation)
Joe Reed (disambiguation)
John Reed (disambiguation)
Joseph Reed (disambiguation)
Mark Reed (disambiguation)
Paul Reed (disambiguation)
Peter Reed (disambiguation)
Robert Reed (disambiguation)
Steve Reed (disambiguation)
Tom Reed (disambiguation)
Thomas Reed (disambiguation)
Tracy Reed (disambiguation)
Vivian Reed (disambiguation)
Walter Reed (disambiguation)
William Reed (disambiguation)

Notes

References

 
  
 
US Census Bureau (9 May 1995). s:1990 Census Name Files dist.all.last (1-100). Retrieved on 24 February 2008.

Surnames
Masculine given names
Surnames of English origin
English-language surnames
Surnames of British Isles origin
Surnames from nicknames